Soda Dam, also known as Alexander Dam, is a dam in Caribou County, Idaho, directly west of the town of Soda Springs.

It impounds Bear River for hydroelectric power, one of the hydropower facilities owned and operated by the electric utility PacifiCorp.

Recreation includes fishing, canoeing, and birdwatching.

References

Dams in Idaho
Reservoirs in Idaho
PacifiCorp dams
Dams completed in 1925
Energy infrastructure completed in 1925
Buildings and structures in Caribou County, Idaho
Hydroelectric power plants in Idaho
Lakes of Caribou County, Idaho
1925 establishments in Idaho